Gyula Batthyány (Ikervár, 10 May 1887 –  Budapest, 20 January 1959) was a Hungarian painter and graphic artist whose works are in the collection of the Hungarian National Gallery as well as other museums around the world.

References 
 
 
 

1887 births
1959 deaths
20th-century Hungarian painters
20th-century Hungarian male artists
Gyula
Hungarian male painters